The term condop in real estate refers to a mixed-use condominium building where at least one of the units is owned by a cooperative corporation and sub-divided into many "co-op" apartments.   The other condo units are typically retained or sold separately by the developer and may be retail space, office space or parking garage.

History
Condops first came into use in the 1960s when the residential condominium was not yet popular in major cities, particularly in the United States in New York City, New York. This structure was used to separate the residential component from the commercial components of a building. Developers or co-op sponsors sought to retain ownership of the more lucrative non-residential spaces in a building, whilst also minimizing taxes on non-residential income. The condop is still a relatively rare item in the U.S.  As of 2007, New York City had fewer than 300 condop buildings as compared to more than 6,700 cooperatives and 2,300 condominiums, representing just over three percent of residential buildings.

Legal definition

The condop is a type of condominium building, not a distinct legal construct.  A condop, an abbreviation of the words condominium and cooperative (or "co-op"), is a co-op inside a condo.

Stepping back, condominium owners actually hold title to a piece of real estate.  Co-op owners are actually shareholder-tenants with shares in and a long-term lease from the co-op corporation.  In all co-ops, a corporation owns the building.  Condops are a variation on that theme the distinction between the two concepts as the cooperative corporation does not own a whole building but just the residential condominium unit within it.

Common use and misuse
Sometimes the phrase condop is used to refer to the residential portion only of such a building (i.e. to distinguish it from the commercial unit(s)).  However, this term is commonly misused to describe a cooperative corporation that behaves like a condominium.

The cooperative portion of the condop is effectively no different than any cooperative building that contains only residential units.  However, in some real-estate circles, the term condop continues to be mis-used to refer to a cooperative that behaves like a condominium or a "co-op with condo rules".  Typically condo will require a lower required down payment for prospective purchasers and do not include many of the restrictive measures that impact prospective purchasers of cooperative apartments.  Further, the bylaws for a condo typically do not include the need for board approval to sell or sublet an apartment.  Additionally, restrictions on alterations to the apartment are more consistent with cooperatives than condos.

See also
 Index of real estate articles

References

 Johnson, Kirk (August 24, 1984).  "About Real Estate; 'Condop':  A New East Side Conversion".  The New York Times.   Retrieved April 21, 2012.
 Kennedy, Shawn G. (June 22, 1986).  "Q and A; Considering a 'Condop'".  The New York Times. Retrieved April 21, 2012.
 DePalma, Anthony (February 20, 1987).  "About Real Estate; A New Lure by Builders: The Condop".  The New York Times. Retrieved April 21, 2012.
 Brooks, Andree (August 9, 1992).  "Talking: Leaseholds; Buying Land under a Co-Op".  The New York Times.  Retrieved April 21, 2012.
 Romano, Jay (March 1, 1998).  "Your Home; Condop: Part Co-Op, Part Condo".  The New York Times.  Retrieved April 21, 2012.
  (November 27, 2005).  "How Condops Differ from Condops".  The New York Times.

Apartment types
Condominium
Housing cooperatives in the United States
Real estate terminology